The LaFontaine-Baldwin Symposium is a Canadian forum created through the joint effort of John Ralston Saul and the Dominion Institute. Founded in 2000, the Symposium's purpose is to stimulate debate about the historical antecedents and future shape of the Canadian democracy. Canada's existence and democratic foundation owes a great deal to the partnership of two 19th century political visionaries, Louis-Hippolyte LaFontaine and Robert Baldwin, the first democratically elected Joint Premiers of the Province of Canada. The Symposium's annual venue honours these two great political reformers.

According to Jocelyn Létourneau, a history professor at Université Laval in Quebec City and senior researcher at the Centre for Interdisciplinary Studies of Francophone Literature, Arts and Traditions in North America, "the myths we (Canadians) used in building our nation have made us victims of our past. And, it's not easy to break the cycle."

An annual lecture at the Symposium is broadcast on CBC Radio One's Ideas.

Past speakers
 John Ralston Saul (2000)
 Alain Dubuc (2001) 
 Georges Erasmus (2002)
 Beverley McLachlin (2003) 
 David Malouf (2004) 
 Louise Arbour (2005) 
 George Elliott Clarke (2006)
 Adrienne Clarkson (2007)
 Sheila Watt-Cloutier (2009)
 His Highness the Aga Khan (2010)
 Naomi Klein (2016)
 Michael Sandel (2017)
 Sue Gardner  (2018)
 Adam Gopnik (2019)

External links
 LaFontaine-Baldwin Symposium
 The Dominion Institute

Political and economic think tanks based in Canada
Political history of Canada
Lecture series